The United States Senate Democratic Steering and Outreach Committee (DSOC) is a committee of the United States Senate dedicated to fostering dialogue between Senate Democrats and community leaders across the United States. The Steering Committee hosts several meetings each year with advocates, activists, policy experts, and elected officials to help the structuring of the Democrats' agenda in the United States Senate. Officials have been all together came to Washington DC for their inauguration and working efforts

Members, 117th Congress

Historical Committee Rosters

116th Congress

After Bill Nelson lost his 2018 reelection bid, he left the committee and his position was left unfilled.

115th Congress

Chairpersons

History

In November 2008, following that year's presidential election, the committee, whose responsibilities include proposing chairmanships and committee assignments to be ratified by the Democratic caucus, considered stripping Connecticut senator Joe Lieberman of his Chairmanship of the United States Senate Committee on Homeland Security and Governmental Affairs after he endorsed Republican senator John McCain in his 2008 presidential campaign. Many within the caucus expressed disappointment over his fervent support for McCain and his questioning of then-Democratic senator Barack Obama's qualifications to run for the position. Ultimately, the caucus voted 42–13 to allow Lieberman to retain his chairmanship while sanctioning him to be removed from the United States Senate Committee on Environment and Public Works.

In November 2016, after Democrat Hillary Clinton lost the 2016 United States presidential election, then-Senate Democratic Leader-elect Chuck Schumer announced Bernie Sanders would fill the newly established position of Outreach Chair in the committee. Sanders came to prominence during the 2016 Democratic Party presidential primaries and his appointment was seen as a broader acknowledgment of his role in galvanizing the electorate. This made Sanders the first independent to hold a leadership position within the Democratic Party.

References

External links

Committees of the United States Senate
Democratic Party (United States) organizations
Leaders of the United States Senate
Lists related to the United States Senate